Abir Moussi (born 15 March 1975) is a Tunisian lawyer and politician. She has been the president of the Free Destourian Party since 2016 and a member of Parliament since 2019. 
Abir Moussi is considered one of the most important and famous Tunisian politicians who defend the civil state and Bourguiba's approach. She is also known for her absolute rejection of political Islam movements and all forms of confusion between religion and politics.

Biography 
Abir Moussi was born on 15 March 1975, in Jemmal to a father working in the national security service (from Beja) and a mother who was a teacher (from Bab Souika).

Professional career 
Holder of a master's degree in law and a DEA in economic and business law, she became a lawyer at the Bar of the Court of Cassation, the highest court in Tunisia. She is also vice-president of the municipality of Ariana, president of the litigation committee and member of the national forum of lawyers of the Democratic Constitutional Rally (RCD) and secretary general of the Tunisian Association of Victims of Terrorism.

Political career 
On 10 January 2010, she was appointed Assistant Secretary General in charge of Women at RCD. Following the fall of President Zine El Abidine Ben Ali's regime and the dissolution of the RCD in 2011, which she opposed as a lawyer, Moussi joined the Destourian Movement, founded by former Prime Minister Hamed Karoui. On 13 August 2016, Moussi was appointed President of the Destourian Movement, renamed the Free Destourian Party. Regularly referred to as an extreme right-wing party, the latter brings together sympathisers of the former Democratic Constitutional Rally which dominated the country before the revolution. She therefore does not recognize the 2014 Constitution and advocates for the establishment of a presidential system.

Moussi has declared herself opposed to the decriminalization of homosexuality. On 16 August 2018, the NGO Association of Help, Homosexual Defense for the Equality of Sexual Orientations (ADHEOS) called for Moussi to be banned from the Schengen Area following homophobic and hate speech, in which she called for the systematic imprisonment of homosexuals, whom she associated with criminals. The NGO also called on the authorities to take measures to protect the rights of homosexuals in the Schengen area. In March 2019, Moussi declared in an interview with the Pan-African Jeune Afrique magazine "I will not legislate on people's privacy. I will ban anal testing, except for rape and felony".

Although she is in favor of equality between men and women in matters of inheritance, Moussi is opposed to the current government's plan to implement it, arguing that by extending rights to children born out of wedlock, it represents an attack on the institution of the family. The proposal of the Individual Freedoms and Equality Committee (COLIBE) to introduce this equality while leaving the legatees the choice of using the old system based on the Qur'an also attracts criticism from the candidate, who sees it as "the door open to customary marriages and discrimination between women themselves".

In June 2020, Moussi sharply criticized speaker of the parliament Rached Ghannouchi and his political party the Ennahda Movement for his ties to the Muslim Brotherhood and for spreading Islamist ideology in Tunisia. Moussi claimed that Ghannouchi were trying to divide Tunisians based on religious views and re-write Tunisian history.

Electoral history

Legislative elections 
In the 2014 legislative election, Abir Moussi was the president of the electoral liste of the Free Destourian Party in the constituency of Béja, her list got 1.05% (836 votes) and she failed to enter the parliament.

In the 2019 legislative election she was again candidate, this time she was head of the list of her party in the second constituency, she got 15.8% (26.076 votes) and came in second place just after the Heart of Tunisia list, she got elected deputy.

Presidential elections 
Abir Moussi was the candidate of her party to the 2019 presidential election where she got 4% of the votes (135,461 votes) and came in 9th place and therefore eliminated since the first round. She was the woman who got the most votes in a presidential elections in Tunisia's history.

Personal life 
She is married and has two daughters.

Distinctions 
  Order of the Republic.

References 

People from Monastir Governorate
1975 births
Tunisian women lawyers
Living people
Carthage University alumni
Members of the Assembly of the Representatives of the People
21st-century Tunisian lawyers
Candidates for President of Tunisia
21st-century Tunisian women politicians
21st-century Tunisian politicians